San Jacinto is a small city in the Canelones Department of southern Uruguay.

San Jacinto is also the name of the municipality to which the city belongs.

Geography

Location

History
On 20 June 1901, its status was elevated to "Pueblo" (village) by the Act of Ley Nº 2.700. On 27 June 1951 it was further elevated to "Villa" (town) by the Act of Ley Nº 11.689. Finally, on 26 November 1976, its status was elevated to "Ciudad" (city) by the Act of Ley Nº 14.605.

Population
According to the 2011 census, San Jacinto had a population of 4,510. In 2010 the Intendencia de Canelones had estimated a population of 7,052 for the municipality during the elections.
 
Source: Instituto Nacional de Estadística de Uruguay

Places of worship
 St. Hyacinth Parish Church (Roman Catholic)

References

External links

INE map of San Jacinto

Populated places in the Canelones Department